The 1923 Air Union Farman Goliath crash  may refer to either of two accidents to Farman F.60 Goliath aircraft operated by Air Union.

May 1923 Air Union Farman Goliath crash, in which F-AEGB crashed at Monsures, Somme, France with the loss of all six on board
August 1923 Air Union Farman Goliath crash, in which F-AECB crashed at East Malling, Kent, with one passenger being killed